Izzy's Koala World is a 2020 docuseries starring Izzy Bee. Produced by Nomadica Films, the series premiered on September 15, 2020. A second season premiered on April 20, 2021.

Premise
On Australia’s Magnetic Island teenage koala caretaker Izzy Bee and her family run a clinic from their home that rescues and rehabilitates injured and orphaned koalas.

Cast
 Izzy Bee
 Ali Bee, Izzy's Mum and the Veterinarian who runs the clinic 
 Tim Bee, Izzy's Dad who runs a beach hire business

Episodes

Season 1 (2020)

Season 2 (2021)

Release
The first season of Izzy's Koala World was released on September 15, 2020, on Netflix.
It had been filmed a year prior, according to the 'Magnetic Island School'.

References

External links

2020 Australian television series debuts
2021 Australian television seasons
2020s Australian documentary television series
English-language Netflix original programming
Netflix original documentary television series
Television series about children
Television series about koalas
Television shows set in Australia